Liebenau is a municipality in the district of Freistadt in the Austrian state of Upper Austria.

Localities 
 Eibenberg
 Geierschlag
 Glashütten
 Hirschau
 Kienau
 Komau
 Leopoldstein
 Liebenstein
 Maxldorf
 Monegg
 Neustift
 Reitern
 Schanz
 Schöneben
 Windhagmühl

Population

References

Cities and towns in Freistadt District